Reginald William Richard (Bill) Colthurst (1922–2009) was Archdeacon of Armagh from 1985 to 1989.

Colthurst was educated at Trinity College, Dublin and the Church of Ireland Theological College. He was ordained in 1942. After curacies in Portadown and Belfast he was the incumbent of Ardtrea, then Richhill, and then Mullavilly.

References

1922 births
Alumni of the Church of Ireland Theological Institute
Alumni of Trinity College Dublin
Deans of Armagh
20th-century Irish Anglican priests
2009 deaths